2011–12 Turkish Cup was the 50th season of the Turkish Cup, won by Fenerbahçe. Ziraat Bankası was the sponsor of the tournament, thus the sponsored name was Ziraat Turkish Cup. The tournament began with first qualifying round matches played on 7 December 2011, and concluded at the 16 May 2012 final. As winners Fenerbahçe already secured a berth in 2012–13 UEFA Champions League through league position, the runners-up Bursaspor will enter 2012–13 UEFA Europa League in second qualifying round. By winning the cup, Fenerbahçe qualified for the 2012 Turkish Super Cup.

Due to scheduling conflicts in the 2011–12 Süper Lig, a format change has been made this season. The group stage matches that were contested between 2005 and 2011 have been abandoned. A knockout tournament format has been adopted. Also the number of participating teams have been reduced from 72 to 57. The new format change had two stages. First, teams were contested in four consecutive rounds for qualifying. After the qualifying stage, a final stage was contested between the 8 remaining teams. All of the final stage matches were contested in neutral venues. Among the 57 teams to compete for the trophy, Beşiktaş were the defending champions, but were eliminated in the fourth round by Boluspor.

Teams and prize money

 Turkish Football Federation awarded prizes not by winning a round, but just for reaching the round. The final match was an exception, where runners-up received less than cup winners. The prize money was in United States dollars.
 Winners of 2012 Turkish Cup Final received 500,000$ extra prize money, making the winners' prize sum 1,400,000$.

First round
The draw for the first round took place at Crowne Plaza in Ankara on 24 November 2011. The matches were played on the first team's home ground on 7 December 2011. 11 winners proceeded to second round.

|}

Second round
The draw for the second round took place at Crowne Plaza in Ankara on 12 December 2011. In this round, the 11 winners from the first round matches were drawn against clubs which were unable to earn promotion from the TFF First League and the three relegated clubs from the top flight. Last six teams of the previous season's TFF First League were drawn against each other. Matches were played on first team's home ground on 20, 21 and 22 December 2011. 14 winners of this round advanced to the third round.

|}

Bracket

Third round
The third round was contested between 14 winners from the second round and the remaining 18 teams from the 2011–12 Süper Lig. A total of 32 teams competed in the third round. Unlike first two rounds, a seeding procedure was underway. First 14 teams of the previous season's Süper Lig were seeded and drawn against 14 winners from second round. Another pot consisted of the 15th team in previous season's Süper Lig and three promoted teams from previous season's TFF First League. Four teams of this pot were drawn against each other with no seedings. The draw ceremony took place at Ataköy Olympic House in Bakırköy, Istanbul on 28 December 2011. Matches were played on first team's home ground on 10, 11 and 12 January 2012.

Fourth round
The fourth round was contested between 16 winners from the third round. A seeding procedure was underway for this round as were in the third round. Seeding was based on previous season's league positions and Turkish football league system. 8 winners in this round played in the finals stage. The draw ceremony took place at Ataköy Olympic House in Bakırköy, Istanbul on 7 March 2012. Matches were played on first team's home ground on 20, 21 and 22 March 2012. Bugsaş Spor were the lowest-ranked club in the fourth round, and were the only club remaining from the third tier of the Turkish football league system.

Quarter-finals
Quarter-finals were contested between 8 winners from the fourth round. All matches were played on neutral grounds. Boluspor was the lowest-ranked club in the quarter-finals, and the only club remaining from the second tier of the Turkish football league system. The draw ceremony for the final stage, including quarter-finals, semi-finals and final, took place at Ataköy Olympic House in Bakırköy, Istanbul on 23 March 2012.

Semi-finals
Semi-final matches were contested between 4 winners from the quarter-finals. Both matches were played on neutral grounds on 25 and 26 April 2012. Winners Bursaspor and Fenerbahçe secured a berth in the final matchup.

Final

The final was contested between semi-finals winners Bursaspor and Fenerbahçe. The match took place on 16 May 2012, at 20:30 local time. The venue for the match was Ankara 19 Mayıs Stadium, a neutral ground. Fenerbahçe won by a decisive score of four nil. Alex was named man of the match.

See also
2011–12 Süper Lig
2012 Turkish Super Cup

References

External links
2011–12 Turkish Cup at Soccerway

Turkish Cup seasons
Cup
Turkey